Blue is the fifth release from Flashlight Brown. The album was intended to be their second release from Hollywood Records but weeks before the release of the album, the band left the label for undisclosed reasons. The release of the album was then delayed indefinitely.

On October 30, 2006, the band posted on their MySpace account that they would release the album the next day, Halloween, in Canada.

Track listing

 "Sicker" - 2:56
 "Fake It" - 3:14
 "I'm Not Sorry" - 3:14
 "I'm A Human" - 3:24
 "One Step Away" - 2:50
 "Get Out of My Car" - 4:02
 "Loud Music" - 2:09
 "Save It For Later" - 2:49
 "Why Did We Care?" - 3:00
 "Party By Myself" - 3:07
 "Frankie's Second Hand" - 2:58
 "That's My Problem" - 3:09
 "Party in My Pants" - 12:00
 "Ugly Baby" - 3:00

2006 albums
Albums produced by Rob Cavallo